Fremont County School District #2 is a public school district based in Dubois, Wyoming, United States.

Geography
Fremont County School District #2 serves the far northwestern portion of Fremont County. The only incorporated town in the district is Dubois.

Schools
Dubois High School (Grades 9–12)
Dubois Elementary/Middle School [also called Dubois K-8] (Grades K-8)

Student demographics
The following figures are as of October 1, 2009.

Total District Enrollment: 178
Student enrollment by gender
Male: 92 (51.69%)
Female: 86 (48.31%)
Student enrollment by ethnicity
American Indian or Alaska Native: 8 (4.49%)
Hispanic or Latino: 1 (0.56%)
White: 169 (94.94%)

See also
List of school districts in Wyoming

References

External links
Fremont County School District #2 – official site.

Education in Fremont County, Wyoming
School districts in Wyoming